Nonnevot is a Limburgian pastry dating back to the 17th century. Hailing from the town of Sittard, the pastry has traditionally been associated with carnival (Limburgian: Vastelaovend), but is nowadays sold year-round in regional bakeries. Its name: nonnevot, or nun's buttocks, comes from the knotted shape of the pastry, resembling the knot on the back of a nun's tunic. The nonnevot is prepared by deep-frying a mixture of flour, yeast, milk, salt, butter, brown sugar, and lard.

See also
 List of doughnut varieties
 List of fried dough varieties

References

External links

Limburgian cuisine
Doughnuts
Sittard-Geleen